Holly Shanahan (born 23 November 1981) is an actress from New Zealand. She is best known for playing Camille in Power Rangers Jungle Fury.

Early life and career
Shanahan grew up in the Taranaki village of Lepperton and attended New Plymouth Girls' High School. She participated in the Sheilah Winn Festival of Shakespeare in Schools, and the New Zealand Schools Shakespeare Production, and from that she was selected to go to the Globe in London as part of the Young Shakespeare Company in 2000. She studied theatre at Victoria University of Wellington. 

Shanahan is known for her main role in the children's TV series, Power Rangers Jungle Fury, and her appearances in television shows The Insiders Guide to Happiness, Power Rangers Mystic Force and Outrageous Fortune. In 2008, she starred in the film, Second Hand Wedding alongside Patrick Wilson, Ryan O'Kane, and Geraldine Brophy. She won a best supporting actress Qantas Film and Television Award for her work in the film. In 2011, she played Detective Constable Caroline Derwent in the mini-series, Underbelly NZ: Land of the Long Green Cloud, which was based on the criminal career of New Zealand drug trafficker Marty Johnstone.

In 2013, Shanahan settled in New Plymouth, where she began working with young performers. She relaunched the West Coast Youth Theatre in 2014 as a way to help young actors enter the arts. She has since continued to appear in TV series and TV movies, and in 2019 she ran Shakespearian acting workshops for drama students.

Shanahan has also appeared on Australian television, with guest appearances in The Doctor Blake Mysteries and Wanted.

Filmography

Television

Films

References

External links
 

1981 births
Living people
New Zealand film actresses
New Zealand television actresses
Victoria University of Wellington alumni
People from Taranaki
People educated at New Plymouth Girls' High School